Boos is a municipality in the district of Unterallgäu in Bavaria in Germany. The town is the seat of the municipal association with Fellheim, Heimertingen, Niederrieden and Pleß.

References

Unterallgäu